Red Bluff Union Elementary School District is a public school district in Tehama County, California, United States.

External links
 

School districts in California